The Renfro Hotel, located on S. Dixie Ave. in Park City, Kentucky, was built in 1903.  It was listed on the National Register of Historic Places in 1983.

It is a brick and wood building built by Schyler Renfro, the owner.  It became the Fishback Hotel in 1928 and in 1940 it became a school for boys.

References

National Register of Historic Places in Barren County, Kentucky
Hotel buildings completed in 1903
Hotel buildings on the National Register of Historic Places in Kentucky
1903 establishments in Kentucky
Schools in Barren County, Kentucky